The European qualification for the 2016 Women's Olympic Volleyball Tournament was held from 4 to 9 January 2016 in Ankara, Turkey. Russia won the tournament by beating Netherlands 3–1, and qualified for the Olympic games. Nataliya Obmochaeva was selected the most valuable player.

Qualification
The host country played with the 7 highest CEV ranking teams which had not yet qualified to the Olympic games. Numbers in brackets denoted the European ranking as of 5 October 2015 except the host which ranked 4th.
 (host)
 (1)
 (2)
 (5)
 (6)
 (7)
 (8)
 (9)

Pools composition
The pools composition was announced on 23 October 2015 at the headquarters of CEV, Luxembourg. It followed the Serpentine system according to their European ranking as of 5 October 2015. CEV reserved the right to seed the hosts as head of Pool A regardless of the European ranking.

Squads

Venue

Pool standing procedure
 Number of matches won
 Match points
 Sets ratio
 Points ratio
 Result of the last match between the tied teams

Match won 3–0 or 3–1: 3 match points for the winner, 0 match points for the loser
Match won 3–2: 2 match points for the winner, 1 match point for the loser

Preliminary round
All times are Eastern European Time (UTC+02:00).

Pool A

Pool B

Final round

Semifinals

Third place

Final

Final standing

Dream team

Most Valuable Player
 Nataliya Obmochaeva
Best Setter
 Yevgeniya Startseva
Best Outside Spiker
 Paola Egonu
 Neriman Özsoy
Best Middle Blocker
 Robin de Kruijf
 Kübra Akman
Best Opposite Spiker
 Lonneke Slöetjes
Best Libero
 Stefania Sansonna

See also

Volleyball at the 2016 Summer Olympics – Men's European qualification

References

External links
Official website
Process

2016 in volleyball
Volleyball qualification for the 2016 Summer Olympics
2016 in Turkish sport
2016
International volleyball competitions hosted by Turkey
2016 in women's volleyball
Vol